Mao Yanling (born 24 February 1980) is a Chinese former gymnast. She competed at the 1996 Summer Olympics, where she finished 19th in the individual all around.

References

External links
 

1981 births
Living people
Chinese female artistic gymnasts
Olympic gymnasts of China
Gymnasts at the 1996 Summer Olympics
Place of birth missing (living people)